Crispin Barrete Varquez (born 5 December 1960) is a prelate of the Catholic Church in the Philippines. He is the current Bishop of Borongan in Eastern Samar. His previous appointment was as Vicar General of the Diocese of Tagbilaran in January 2007.

Early life
Varquez was born in Sevilla, Bohol on 5 December 1960. 

He earned his Philosophy degree at the Immaculate Heart of Mary Seminary in Tagbilaran, Bohol and his Theology degree at the St. Augustine Major Seminary in Tagaytay, Cavite.

Ministry
Varquez was ordained to the priesthood on 14 April 1989; his first posting was as assistant parish priest in Mindoro. In the 1990s until 2000, he served as formator at the seminaries of the Immaculate Heart of Mary in Tagbilaran and St. Augustine in Tagaytay. He was later parish priest in various parishes of Tagbilaran prior to his appointment as Vicar General.

He was appointed bishop on 4 August 2007. He was ordained to the Episcopacy by his Predecessor Most Rev. Leonardo Y. Medroso, D.D., Bishop of Tagbilaran together the Co-Consecrators Surigao Bishop Antonieto Cabajog and Palo Archbishop José S. Palma

References

External links

21st-century Roman Catholic bishops in the Philippines
People from Bohol
People from Borongan
1960 births
Living people